Robert Gruffydd (by 1515 – 1575 or later) was the member of Parliament for the constituency of Caernarfon in the parliaments of 1545 and 1558.

References 

Year of birth uncertain
Year of death uncertain
1510s births
1570s deaths
English MPs 1545–1547
Members of Parliament for Caernarfon
Members of the Parliament of England (pre-1707) for constituencies in Wales